Azizan bin Ariffin  ( October 25, 1952, in Yan) is the 17th and the former Chief of Defence Forces. He is the first ever head of the Malaysian Armed Forces (MAF) appointed from the Royal Malaysian Air Force (RMAF).

Education 
Azizan joined the Royal Malaysian Air Force (RMAF) on October 15, 1970. He later finishes his training at Royal Military College on April 16, 1971 and commissioned as Pilot officer (Nato OF-1).

After graduating, he was absorbed into Air Traffic Control (ATC) Branch and then was sent to Australia for basic and advance ATC course for two years. His first ever job in RMAF was as an ATC Officer at Kuala Lumpur RMAF Air Base. He was later assigned to Paya Lebar Air Base, Singapore and then Kuantan RMAF Air Base, both as an ATC Officer.

Azizan began his training as an aviator after being sent to Basic Aviation Course in Australia on April 15, 1976. He was given his pilot brevet on July 8, 1977.

Military career 
Azizan has had a prosperous air force aviator career. He has flown varieties of aircraft in RMAF arsenal including CT/4s, Aermacchi MB-326H, Bulldog B 100, Cessna 402B, BAe 125, Fokker F28, Pilatus PC-7, Falcon 900 and also C-130 Hercules.

Among the task he has held include Squadron Leader in VIP Squadron and examiner, chief instructor and instructor at the RMAF Flying Academy. He also was a member of the RMAF Acrobatic Team — the Taming Sari Team.

Azizan was promoted to Lieutenant Colonel and began to work in command and staff related task at all three branches of the Malaysian Armed Forces. Among the important task he has held include as Defence Advisor for Islamabad, Pakistan, Director (Training) at the Air Force Command and Chief-of-staff for 2nd Air Division. Azizan then promoted to General officer in 1996 and given task as the Chief of 2nd Air Division. He later appointed as Commandant for Air Force College and Malaysian Armed Force Academy ( — ATMA) (now National Defence University of Malaysia — UPNM).

Azizan then held position of Chief of Air Operation and Deputy Chief of Air Force before appointed as the 15th Chief of Air Force ( — PTU) on 30 October 2006.

On 1 September 2009, Azizan making history by becoming the first Chief of Defence Forces from RMAF. Azizan is the second non-army Chief of Defence Forces after Admiral Mohammad Anwar Mohd Nor. The Chief of Defence Forces' position is usually dominated by the Malaysian Army.

Retirement from Armed Forces 
After almost 41 years service in Armed Forces, General Tan Sri Azizan finally retired on June 15, 2011. His position as Perintah Ulung was then succeeded by General Tan Sri Zulkifeli Mohd Zin.

Later work 
After retirement, General Tan Sri Azizan started being involved in business.

Honours

National Honours
For his service to the country, General Tan Sri Azizan was awarded with multiple awards from the federal, states and military. Among the awards is Courageous Commander of the Order of Military Service (PGAT), Loyal Commander of the Order of Military Service (PSAT), Grand Knight of the Order of the Crown of Pahang (SIMP), Knight Companion of the Order of Sultan Ahmad Shah of Pahang (DSAP), Datuk Sri Panglima of the Order of Taming Sari (SPTS), Knight Commander of the Order of Loyalty to Sultan Abdul Halim Mu'adzam Shah (DHMS), Knight Companion of the Order of Loyalty to the Royal House of Kedah (DSDK), Grand Knight of the Order of Sultan Ahmad Shah of Pahang (SSAP), Commander of the Order of Loyalty to the Crown of Malaysia (PSM), Warrior of the Order of Military Service (PAT), Companion of the Order of the Defender of the Realm (JMN), Companion of the Order of Loyalty to the Royal Family of Malaysia (JSD) and Officer of the Order of Military Service (KAT).

  :
  Companion of the Order of Loyalty to the Royal Family of Malaysia (JSD) (1993)
  Companion of the Order of the Defender of the Realm (JMN) (2004)
  Commander of the Order of Loyalty to the Crown of Malaysia (PSM) - Tan Sri (2007)
  Commander of the Order of the Defender of the Realm (PMN) - Tan Sri (2010)

  :
  Knight Companion of the Order of Sultan Ahmad Shah of Pahang (DSAP) - Dato' (2003)
  Grand Knight of the Order of the Crown of Pahang (SIMP) - Dato' Indera (2004)
  Grand Knight of the Order of Sultan Ahmad Shah of Pahang (SSAP) - Dato' Sri (2006)

  :
  Knight Commander of the Order of Loyalty to Sultan Abdul Halim Mu'adzam Shah (DHMS) - Dato' Paduka (2006)

  :
  Knight Grand Commander of the Order of Taming Sari (SPTS) - Dato' Seri Panglima (2008)

  :
  Commander of the Order of the Defender of State (DGPN) - Dato' Seri (2010)

  :
  Knight Commander of the Order of the Star of Sarawak (PNBS) - Dato Sri (2010)

Foreign Honours
:
 Commander of the Philippine Legion of Honor (C.L.H.) (2009)

Personal life 
General Tan Sri Azizan happily married with Puan Sri Noorainee Abd Rahim and together has been blessed with 5 children.

References 

1952 births
Living people
Royal Malaysian Air Force personnel
Malaysian military personnel
Knights Commander of the Most Exalted Order of the Star of Sarawak
Companions of the Order of the Defender of the Realm
Commanders of the Order of Loyalty to the Crown of Malaysia
Commanders of the Order of the Defender of the Realm
21st-century Malaysian people
Companions of the Order of Loyalty to the Royal Family of Malaysia
National Defence College, India alumni